Davit Tsomaia (born 4 September 1967) is a retired Georgian professional football player.

1967 births
Living people
Soviet footballers
Footballers from Georgia (country)
Georgia (country) international footballers
Expatriate footballers from Georgia (country)
Expatriate footballers in Finland
FC Guria Lanchkhuti players
FC Alazani Gurjaani players
Association football defenders